A surfer takes part in the sport of surfing.

Surfer may also refer to:

Surfer (EP), a 2001 EP by NOFX
Surfer (advertisement), an advertising campaign to promote Guinness-brand draught stout 
Surfer (magazine), an American surfing culture magazine

See also
Surfing (disambiguation)
Surfer Dude (disambiguation)
Surfers Paradise (disambiguation)
Surfer hair